Inbaa is a 2008 Indian Tamil-language masala film directed by S.T. Vendan. The film stars Shaam and Sneha, with Arun Pandian in an antagonistic role. It was released on 21 March 2008. The film marks the third collaboration between Shaam and Sneha after Yai! Nee Romba Azhaga Irukey! and ABCD.

Plot 

Inba is a rough character who works under Priya's brother, Malai Ganesan, as a bodyguard of Priya. Priya is an usurious girl, spending most of the time with her friends and absenting herself from the college several times. Hence Malai Ganeshan employs Inba, his faithful servant to guard Priya's activities. Priya insults him several times since she was not interested in somebody guarding her all the time. Priya falls for Inba, but he rejects it. In the meantime, Malai Ganeshan learns of the love affair and opposes it by beating up Inba. Inba opens flashback and the rest of story describes how Priya makes him understand his love and finally succeeds in his love after overcoming the hurdles and obstacles laid by Malai Ganeshan.

Cast 

Shaam as Inba
Sneha as Priya
Arun Pandian as Malai Ganesan
Rekha as Malai Ganesan's wife
Ganja Karuppu as a locksmith
Aravind as Rupan
Adithya as Rupan's brother
Poornitha as Jyothi
Thalaivasal Vijay as Inba's father
Sulakshana as Inba's mother
Boys Rajan
Suruli Manohar
Pei Krishnan as a police officer
Shankar
Bayilvan Ranganathan as a police officer

Production 
The film began production as Thooral. Shaam was signed to play an auto driver and grew a beard for his role in the film.

Soundtrack

Release and reception 
A critic from Rediff.com gave the film a rating of one out of five stars and wrote that "Everybody spouts the standard lines (what was dialogue-writer Subha thinking?) and once the climax is done, you heave yourself off the cramped seats with relief". Sudhish Kamath from The Hindu wrote that "By all means, go for Inba. It's the most inspiring piece of Tamil cinema. If this chap can make a movie, so can you". A critic from Sify gave the film a verdict of below average and wrote that "The film fails to entertain as the twists and turns are predictable, the Shaam- Sneha romance leaves you cold, and music of P.B Balaji is worth a snore not even one humable number. It is another banal formula film to be avoided".

Following the success of Kick, the film was partially reshot in Telugu as Neelo Naalo with actors Sunil and Junior Relangi. The Telugu version was directed by Nandhu and featured Kothapalli Ramakrishna as the cinematographer.

References

External links 

2000s masala films
2000s Tamil-language films
2008 films